Josephine Foster  is an American singer, songwriter, and musician from Colorado. She is known for her anachronistic voice and work that weaves older styles with the modern, escaping simple classification.

As a teenager Foster worked as a church singer and aspired to become an opera singer.  She moved to Chicago in 1998 to further her opera studies, and began home-recording her songs, resulting in the albums There Are Eyes Above, influenced by Tin Pan Alley, and an album of children's songs, Little Life.  She then released collaborative albums with local folk bands The Children's Hour (SOS JFK), Born Heller (S/T), as well as All the Leaves Are Gone, a psychedelic rock album with backing band The Supposed.

A number of solo records followed, including the all acoustic Hazel Eyes, I Will Lead You, an unorthodox collection of 19th century German Lieder titled A Wolf in Sheep's Clothing, and This Coming Gladness, a psychedelic folk-rock album.

Foster released most of her recordings the following decade with Fire Records, including Graphic as a Star, her settings of 27 Emily Dickinson poems.

Thereafter she began to record frequently with engineer Andrija Tokic, who co-produced with Foster her solo albums Blood Rushing, I'm A Dreamer, and Faithful Fairy Harmony; also More Amor, a psych-folk album by her new band Mendrugo formed with Victor Herrero.  The latter was Foster's first foray into writing lyrics in Spanish.

The title song from I'm A Dreamer was featured in Season 2, episode 7 of the British television show The End of the F***ing World.

Foster also lent her voice to the soundtrack for the 2020 film, The World to Come, and sung (as well as co-wrote) the titular song over the end credits.

References

External links

 

1974 births
21st-century American guitarists
21st-century American women guitarists
21st-century American women singers
American women singer-songwriters
American folk musicians
Guitarists from Colorado
Living people
New Weird America
Psychedelic folk musicians
21st-century American singers
Singer-songwriters from Colorado
Fire Records (UK) artists
Locust Music artists